Konkovo District  is an administrative district (raion) of South-Western Administrative Okrug, and one of the 125 raions of Moscow, Russia. Population: 97,847 (2017 est.).It is located in the south of the city, along the Kaluzhsko-Rizhskaya (orange) metro line.

See also
Administrative divisions of Moscow

References

Notes

Districts of Moscow